Take a Chance is a 1918 American short comedy film featuring Harold Lloyd.

Plot
Harold becomes smitten with a hired girl (Bebe) who is washing a staircase. When Bebe's beau (Snub) arrives to drive her to a picnic, Harold stealthily sneaks into the back seat of Snub's car. Without their being aware of his presence, Harold causes them to get into a fight. When the car arrives at the picnic grounds, Harold and Bebe enter the park together and enjoy a frantic few moments on a seesaw. Two prison escapees enter the park. One clubs Harold over the head and dresses him in his prison garb to confuse the pursuing police force. Harold uses his wits and athletic ability to elude capture by many officers.

Cast
 Harold Lloyd
 Snub Pollard
 Bebe Daniels
 William Blaisdell
 Sammy Brooks
 Harry Burns 
 Billy Fay
 James A. Fitzgerald
 William Gillespie
 Lew Harvey
 Wallace Howe
 Bud Jamison
 Dee Lampton
 Belle Mitchell

See also
 Harold Lloyd filmography

References

External links

1918 films
1918 comedy films
1918 short films
Silent American comedy films
American silent short films
American black-and-white films
Films directed by Alfred J. Goulding
American comedy short films
1910s American films
1910s English-language films